Alí Rodríguez Araque (9 September 1937 – 19 November 2018) was a Venezuelan politician, lawyer, and diplomat.

He was the leader of the political party Patria Para Todos ("Fatherland for All") and occupied various positions in the government of President Hugo Chávez, such as oil advisor, General Secretary of OPEC, President of Petróleos de Venezuela (PDVSA), Minister of External Relations and Ambassador to Cuba. He was appointed as Minister of Finance in June 2008. His last occupation was Ambassador of Venezuela in Cuba since 2014 until his death in 2018.

Career 
Born in Ejido, Mérida, he received his legal certification from Universidad Central de Venezuela in Caracas in 1961. He studied economics, specialising in crude oil; he wrote several works about the energy sector.

During the 1960s and early 1970s, he was active in the Marxist guerrilla movement operating in Venezuela. He was known as "Commander Fausto", allegedly acting as an explosives expert. He was one of the last guerrilla fighters to put down arms, after the so-called "appeasement" policy (Pacificación) signaled the end of the armed insurgency. He was pardoned and became involved in parliamentary politics, and was elected to the then National Congress. He was minister of energy of Venezuela from 1999, when Chávez took office, until 2000.

In 2000 he was elected secretary-general of OPEC and served from January 2001 to July 2002. He then became president of Venezuela's state-owned oil company Petróleos de Venezuela (PDVSA), where he masterminded the firing of more than 20,000 workers in response to their part in the company's leading role in the Venezuelan general strike of 2002-2003. He remained in that position until November 2004 when Chávez appointed him foreign minister in a cabinet reshuffle. On 1 September 2006, Rodríguez was appointed as Ambassador of Venezuela to Cuba. Later he served some time as Vice President of the United Socialist Party of Venezuela for the Andean region in Venezuela before being appointed as Minister of Finance by Chávez on 15 June 2008. He died in Havana on 19 November 2018 at the age of 81.

See also 

List of Venezuelans 
List of Ministers of Foreign Affairs of Venezuela

References

External links 

World Energy Magazine – The Global Energy Industry: An Opportunity for Cooperation, Stability and Investment
World Energy Magazine – OPEC: New Realities and New Challenges

1937 births
2018 deaths
People from Mérida (state)
Venezuelan Ministers of Foreign Affairs
Central University of Venezuela alumni
Recipients of Venezuelan presidential pardons
Presidents of PDVSA
Finance ministers of Venezuela
Fatherland for All politicians
United Socialist Party of Venezuela politicians
Secretaries General of OPEC
Recipients of the Order of the Liberator General San Martin
Secretaries General of the Union of South American Nations
Ambassadors of Venezuela to Cuba
Venezuelan guerrillas
Energy ministers of Venezuela